Benedikt "Bene" Böhm (born 15 August 1977 in Munich) is a German extreme ski mountaineer and extreme skier. Together with Sebastian Haag he keeps the records in speed ski mountaineering at the Muztagata and the Gasherbrum II.

Böhm has grown up with five siblings in Harlaching, a borough of Munich. One of his brothers is the German artist Corbinian Böhm. Böhm is member of the national German Skimountaineering Team and member of the Dynafit Gore-Tex team. He also works at Dynafit as an international sales manager.

Selected results 
 2004:
 5th, German Championship
 2005:
 5th, German Championship
 speed record in high altitude mountaineering with downhill skiing at the Muztagata together with Sebastian Haag under the leadership of Matthias Robl, 23 August 2005
 2006:
 speed record in high altitude mountaineering with downhill skiing at the Gasherbrum II together with Sebastian Haag under the leadership of Luis Stitzinger, 3 August 2006

Patrouille des Glaciers 

 2008: 2nd ("seniors I" ranking), together with Georg Nickaes and Gerhard Reithmeier
 2010: 2nd ("seniors II" ranking), together with Javier Martín de Villa and Pete Swenson

External links 
 Benedikt Böhm at skimountaineering.org
 Stefan Winter: Germans summit G2 and then ski down: great pictures!

References 

German mountain climbers
German male ski mountaineers
Sportspeople from Munich
1977 births
Living people